Thomas Frank Cassels ( – April 2, 1903) was  an attorney and politician in Memphis, Tennessee who served a term in the Tennessee House of Representatives for the 42nd General Assembly (1881–1882). A Republican, he represented Shelby County, Tennessee.

He was the first African-American admitted to the bar association in Memphis. He represented Ida B. Wells in her lawsuit against C&O Railroad. He served as Assistant Attorney General in Memphis and was a presidential elector in 1888.

References

Republican Party members of the Tennessee House of Representatives
African-American state legislators in Tennessee
1840s births
1903 deaths
Tennessee lawyers
People from Jackson County, Ohio
People from Memphis, Tennessee
19th-century American politicians
African-American politicians during the Reconstruction Era
20th-century African-American people